Walter Kavanagh may refer to:

Walter MacMurrough Kavanagh (1856–1922), Irish politician
Walter Kavanagh (cricketer) (1814–1836), Irish cricketer